Langvasseggi is a mountain on the border of Skjåk Municipality in Innlandet county and Stryn Municipality in Vestland county, Norway. The mountain is surrounded by several other notable mountains including Raudeggi to the southeast, Kvitlenova to the south, Nuken to the southwest, and Breiddalseggi to the north. The Norwegian National Road 15 runs along the north side of the mountain. The lake Langvatnet lies just south of the mountain.

See also
List of mountains of Norway

References

Stryn
Skjåk
Mountains of Innlandet
Mountains of Vestland